Carbosphaerella is a genus of fungi in the Halosphaeriaceae family. The genus contains two species.

References

External links
Carbosphaerella at Index Fungorum

Sordariomycetes genera
Microascales